The 106th Brigade was a formation of  the British Army during the First World War. It was raised as part of the new army also known as Kitchener's Army and assigned to the 35th Division. The brigade served on the Western Front.

History
The infantry was originally composed of Bantams, that is soldiers who would otherwise be excluded from service due to their short stature. This became a regular infantry Brigade with the end of the Bantam experiment at the end of 1916, after it was noted that bantam replacements were not up to the physical standards of the original recruits.

The brigade was disbanded in April 1919 at Ripon, the brigade was not reformed in the Second World War.

Order of Battle
The composition of the brigade was as follows:
17th Battalion, (Rosebery), Royal Scots 
17th Battalion, (2nd Leeds), West Yorkshire Regiment (left November 1917)
19th Battalion, (2nd County of Durham), Durham Light Infantry  (left February 1918)
18th Battalion, (4th Glasgow), Highland Light Infantry (disbanded February 1918)
4th (Extra Reserve) Battalion, North Staffordshire Regiment (joined November 1917, left, to 105th Brigade, February 1918)
12th Battalion, Highland Light Infantry (joined February 1918) 
106th Machine Gun Company (joined April 1916, left for division MG battalion February 1918)
106th Trench Mortar Battery (joined April 1916)

Commanders
Brig-Gen H O'Donnell to 13 May 1916
Brig-Gen J H W Pollard C.B., C.M.G. from 13 May 1916, to March 1919

References

Bibliography

Infantry brigades of the British Army in World War I
Pals Brigades of the British Army